Jean-Baptiste-Joseph Duchesne (1770, Gisors, Eure - 1856, Paris) was a French painter and miniaturist.

He became known after the exposition of 1804 and was a royal painter during Restoration. His works are quite realistic.

Biography
Jean-Baptiste-Joseph Duchesne, known as Duchesne de Gisors, a French painter of miniatures and enamels, was born at Gisors in 1770. He was the son of Jean Baptiste Duchesne, a sculptor, and a pupil of Vincent. He exhibited at first under the name of Duchesne, afterwards under that of Duchesne des Argillers, and finally, from 1833 until his death, under that of Duchesne de Gisors. He died at Gisors in 1856.

References

 

1770 births
1856 deaths
People from Eure
18th-century French painters
French male painters
19th-century French painters
French enamellers
19th-century enamellers
18th-century enamellers
Portrait miniaturists
19th-century French male artists
18th-century French male artists